Asura wandammensis is a moth of the family Erebidae. It is found in New Guinea.

References

wandammensis
Moths described in 1916
Moths of New Guinea